Phil Traill (born June 6, 1973) is a British television and film director. Although born in New Jersey, Phil was brought up in London, England.

Filmography

Film

Television

References

External links

1973 births
British film directors
British male screenwriters
British television directors
Living people
People from New Jersey